Table tennis at the 1999 Southeast Asian Games is being held in the Menglait Sports Hall, in Bandar Seri Begawan, Brunei from 8 to 15 August 1999.

Participating nations
A total of 80 athletes from nine nations are competing in table tennis at the 1999 Southeast Asian Games:

Medalists

Medal table

References

External links
 

1999
Southeast Asian Games
Bandar Seri Begawan